Associazione Sportiva Dilettantistica Siracusa Calcio 1924, commonly referred to as Siracusa, is an Italian football club based in Syracuse, Sicily. The club currently plays in Eccellenza Sicily, the fifth-tier of football in Italy.

History
Former clubs in Syracuse were:
Tommaso Gargallo, 1924,
A.S. Siracusa, 1937,
U.S. Siracusa, 1996,
Siracusa Calcio, 2013.

A.S.D. Siracusa

In July 2019, another phoenix club was founded in Syracuse and named after the city as A.S.D. Città di Siracusa, the third team to do so in the 2010s. On 8 August, the phoenix club was admitted to Promozione Sicily, the sixth tier of Italian football and the second highest tier of Sicily local football league. In 2021 the club was totally sold and became F.C. Leonzio 1909.

Another re-foundation
Immediately after the old club fled to Lentini, A.S.D. Marina di Ragusa moved to Syracuse and became actual A.S.D. Città di Siracusa. The club was then renamed to A.S.D. Siracusa Calcio 1924 in 2022.

Colours and badge 
The colours of the team are sky blue and white.

Notable former players

Honours

Footnotes

References

Football clubs in Italy
Football clubs in Sicily
Sport in Syracuse, Sicily
Association football clubs established in 1937
Association football clubs established in 2019
Association football clubs established in 2021
Serie B clubs
Serie C clubs
Serie D clubs
1924 establishments in Italy
1937 establishments in Italy
2021 establishments in Italy
Coppa Italia Serie C winning clubs
Phoenix clubs (association football)